is a Japanese politician of the Democratic Party of Japan (DPJ), a member of the House of Representatives in the Diet (national legislature). A native of Rikuzentakata, Iwate and graduate of Waseda University, he worked at the city government of Rikuzentakata from 1977 to 1994. After having served in the Iwate Prefectural Assembly for two terms since 1995, he was elected to the House of Representatives for the first time in 2000 as a member of Ichirō Ozawa's Liberal Party, which merged with the DPJ in 2003.

References

External links 
  in Japanese.
 DPJ Lower House Member Loses Family, Home and Aide To Tsunami 31 March 2011 Dow Jones

1953 births
Living people
Politicians from Iwate Prefecture
Waseda University alumni
Members of the House of Representatives (Japan)
Members of the Iwate Prefectural Assembly
Liberal Party (Japan, 1998) politicians
Democratic Party of Japan politicians
21st-century Japanese politicians